The following tables compare general and technical information for a number of available database administrator tools. Please see individual product articles for further information. This article is neither all-inclusive nor necessarily up to date.

Systems listed on a light purple background are no longer in active development.

General

Features 
Legend
 Create/alter table:
 Yes - can create table, alter its definition and data, and add new rows
 Some - can only create/alter table definition, not data
 Browse table:
 Yes - can browse table definition and data
 Some - can only browse table definition
 Multi-server support:
 Yes - can manage from the same window/session multiple servers
 Some - can manage from a different window/session multiple servers
 Monitoring server:
 Yes - includes a headless server, that runs checks and reports failures

Features (continued)

Legend:
 User manager:
 Yes - user manager with support for database and schema permissions as well as for individual object (table, view, functions) permissions
 Some - simple user manager with support for database and schema permissions
 No - no user manager, or read-only user manager

Features - visual design and reverse engineering 

Legend:
 Visual schema/E-R design: the ability to draw entity-relationship diagrams for the database. If missing, the following two features will also be missing
 Reverse engineering - the ability to produce an ER diagram from a database, complete with foreign key relationships
 Yes - supports incremental reverse engineering, preserving user modifications to the diagram and importing only changes from the database
 Some - can only reverse engineer the entire database at once and drops any user modifications to the diagram (can't "refresh" the diagram to match the database)
 Forward engineering - the ability to update the database schema with changes made to its entities and relationships via the ER diagram visual designer
 Yes - can update user-selected entities
 Some - can only update the entire database at once

See also
Comparison of data modeling tools
Comparison of object database management systems
Comparison of object–relational database management systems
Comparison of relational database management systems
List of relational database management systems
SQL programming tool

Notes

References 

 
Tools